Bame or BAME may refer to:
 Black, Asian and minority ethnic, a UK demographic
 Bamê, a village in China
 Bame, in the list of cities and towns in Arunachal Pradesh
 Bame Monrovia, a football club in Liberia

See also
 Boehm, in American English, usually pronounced similarly: .